The 1973 Gwent County Council election was held on Thursday 12 April 1973 to elect councillors to the new Gwent County Council, governing the new county of Gwent, Wales. It took place on the same day as other county council elections in the United Kingdom.

These were the first elections to the new county council, which would come into effect on 1 April 1974. Future elections would take place every four years, with the next one scheduled for April 1977.

The 1973 election saw the Labour Party win a strong majority on the Council.

Background
Gwent was created following local government reorganisation enacted by the Local Government Act 1972. It covered the area of Monmouthshire and Newport County Borough, which would be transferred from England to Wales in 1974.

The 1973 elections were the first to the new local authorities, with councillors acting in a shadow capacity until 1 April 1974 when the new councils took full effect.

The position of alderman on the local authorities was abolished, with all members of the new councils being elected ward councillors.

Overview of the result

Seventy-eight Gwent County Council seats in 66 electoral wards were up for election in April 1973. Labour overall increased its presence in comparison with the old councils, though there were some close battles between Labour, the Liberals and Independents in some wards.

In Cwmbran Labour did not fare so well, with an Independent and a Ratepayer candidate winning seats, and the Conservatives polling strongly.

|}

Ward results
Contests took place in 49 wards, with candidates in seventeen of the wards being elected unopposed.

Aberbeeg and Six Bells (1 seat)

Abercarn and Cwmcarn (1 seat)

Abergavenny Cantref and Grofield (1 seat)

Abergavenny Castle and Priory (1 seat)

Abersychan Central (1 seat)

Abersychan North (1 seat)

Abertillery (1 seat)

Alexandra (1 seat)

Allt-yr-yn (1 seat)

Alway (2 seats)

Bassaleg and Marshfield (1 seat)

Bedwellty No. 2 Pengam (1 seat)

Bedwellty No. 3 Argoed and Cefn Fforest (1 seat)

Beechwood (2 seats)

Bettws (1 seat)

Blackwood (1 seat)

Blaenavon (1 seat)

Brynmawr (1 seat)

Caerleon (1 seat)

Caerwent (1 seat)

Caldicot (1 seat)

Central (1 seat)

Chepstow (1 seat)

Crickhowell and Llanelly Parish (1 seat)

Crucorny Fawr and Llantilio Pertholey (1 seat)

Crumlin (1 seat)

Cwmbran Central and Llantarnam (1 seat)

Cwmtillery (1 seat)

Ebbw Vale, Badminton, Beaufort and N Central

Ebbw Vale Central, Cwm and South Central

Fairwater and Henllys (1 seat)

Langstone (1 seat)

Llanfoist and Llanover (1 seat)

Llanfrechfa Lower (2 seats)

Llanhilleth (1 seat)

Lliswerry (2 seats)

Malpas (1 seat)

Monmouth (1 seat)

Mynyddislwyn Penmaen (1 seat)

Nantyglo and Blaina Central and South (1 seat)

Nantyglo and Blaina North (1 seat)

Newbridge (1 seat)

Old Cwmbran (1 seat)

Councillor Rex was a credit company agent and had been a member of Cwmbran Urban Council for 16 years.

Panteg East (1 seat)

This was local newspaper reporter Don Touhig's first ever election, which he won by over 700 votes.

Panteg West (1 seat)

Pontllanfraith (1 seat)

Pontnewydd (1 seat)

Councillor Pritchard was General Secretary of the Monmouthshire Federation of Ratepayers.

Pontnewydd North (1 seat)

Pontnewydd South (1 seat)

Pontypool (1 seat)

Ringland (2 seats)

Risca Central (1 seat)

Risca North (1 seat)

Risca South (1 seat)

Rogerstone (1 seat)

Shaftesbury (2 seats)

Shirenewton and Tintern (1 seat)

St Julians (2 seats)

St Woolos (2 seats)

Tredegar Central and West (1 seat)

Bill Harry had been one of four Monmouthshire county councillors in Tredegar for 13 years, but Gwent County Council would only have three Tredegar county councillors, with Harry being the loser against Angus Donaldson who was a sitting Liberal Monmouthshire councillor for Tredegar.

Tredegar Georgetown (1 seat)

Tredegar Sirhowy (1 seat)

Councillor Thomas won after a recount.

Upper Cwmbran (1 seat)

Usk and Pontypool Rural (1 seat)

Victoria (1 seat)

Percy Jones, an alderman and former major of Newport County Borough had been a council member in Newport for 20 years.

Ynysddu (1 seat)

See also
 1972 Newport County Borough Council election

Notes

References

Gwent
Council elections in Gwent